The term non-fiction writer covers vast fields. This list includes those with a Wikipedia page who had non-fiction works published. 
Countries named are where authors worked for long periods.
Subject codes: A (architecture), Aa (applied arts), Af (armed forces), Ag (agriculture), Ar (archaeology, prehistory), B (business, finance), Ba (ballet), Bg (biography), Bk (books), C (cookery, housekeeping), Cr (crime, disasters), D (drama, film), E (economics), Ed (education, child care), F (feminism, role of women), Fa (fashion), Fi (fine arts), G (gardening), H (history, antiquarianism), I (information technology), J (journalism, broadcasting), L (language), Lc (literary criticism), Lw (law), Ma (mathematics), Me (medicine, health), Mu (music), N (natural sciences), Nh (natural history, environment), O (opera), P (polymath), Ph (philosophy), Po (politics, government), Ps (psychology), R (religion, metaphysics), S (social sciences, society), Sp (sports, games, hunting), T (travel, localities), Tr (transport)
Language is mentioned where unclear.
A single book title exemplifying an author also needs a Wikipedia page for inclusion.

A

B

C

D

E

F

G

H

I

J

K

L

M

N

O

P

Q

R

S

T

U

V

W

Y

Z

See also
List of biographers
List of critics
List of essayists
List of historians
Lists of philosophers
List of political authors
List of non-fiction environmental writers
List of American non-fiction environmental writers
Lists of writers

References

Non-fiction